Sara Ferrari (born 30 September 1977) is an Italian retired female marathon runner, which participated at the 2001 World Championships in Athletics. She competed in the women's marathon and she finished in 26th place.

In 1996, she finished in 10th place in the women's 5000 metres at the 1996 World Junior Championships in Athletics held in Sydney, Australia.

Achievements

References

External links
 

1977 births
Living people
Italian female long-distance runners
Italian female marathon runners
World Athletics Championships athletes for Italy
20th-century Italian women
21st-century Italian women